The Embassy of India in Kuwait City is a diplomatic mission of the Republic of India to Kuwait.

Leadership
Ambassador is in charge of the embassy. Sibi George is the current Ambassador of India to Kuwait.

Jurisdiction
Embassy serves Kuwait region.

Education
Scholarships are offered by the embassy to local nationals to study in India.

See also
India–Kuwait relations
List of diplomatic missions in Kuwait
List of diplomatic missions of India

References

External links

Kuwait
India